Masha Mansoor is a town and a union council in the Lakki Marwat District of Khyber-Pakhtunkhwa. Masha and Mansoor are two separate villages. Masha belongs to Malak Masha (the Khan or head of the Malaks).Salman Aafie

Leadership 
Malak Zain Ul Abedin Khan Marwat has been the political leader since 1997. He is a transportation tycoon and the first son of Malak Bahauddin Khan Marwat. Malak Siraj Uddin Khan Marwat is his grandfather. 

His son Malik Imran Khanalso plays a role in the politics of Lakki Marwat. He was a Member of Khyber-Pakhtunkhwa Parliament in 2002 and served as a Member of Standing Committee No. 18 on the Local Government Election and Rural Development Department, and a Member of Standing Committee No. 08 on Higher Education, Archives, and Libraries. His elder brother Malik Noor Saleem Khan graduated from Boston University in Massachusetts, United States. He is a current Member of Parliament in 2013, Party Affiliation Jamiat Ulema-e-Islam (F), Malakano Kor, Marwat State.

References

Union councils of Lakki Marwat District
Populated places in Lakki Marwat District